Cynaeda obscura is a moth in the family Crambidae. It was described by Warren in 1892. It is found in Lebanon.

References

Moths described in 1892
Odontiini
Taxa named by William Warren (entomologist)